The elm cultivar Ulmus 'Globosa' was first described (as Ulmus campestris globosa Behnsch) in the Späth nursery catalogue of 1892–93. Considered "probably Ulmus carpinifolia (: minor)" by Green

Description
Späth described the tree as having an uninterrupted, very dense, strongly branched, globose crown with firm, coriaceous shining leaves, but very different from 'Umbraculifera'. The leaves were said to be like those of 'Berardii'.

Cultivation
No specimens are known to survive.

Synonymy
Ulmus campestris globosa  Behnsch

References

External links
 Sheet labelled Ulmus procera Salisb. globosa (Nich.), Hortus Nymphenburg, Munich, 1957
 Sheet labelled Ulmus procera Salisb. globosa (Nich.), Hortus Nymphenburg, Munich, 1957

Ulmus articles missing images
Ulmus
Missing elm cultivars